Etienne Via (1596–1650) was a Roman Catholic prelate who served as Titular Bishop of Cyrene (1637–1650).

Biography
Etienne Via was born in 1596 in Prati de Tuscia, Italy.
On 20 April 1637, he was appointed during the papacy of Pope Urban VIII as Titular Bishop of Cyrene.
He served as Titular Bishop of Cyrene until his death on 1 September 1650.

References

External links and additional sources
 (for Chronology of Bishops) 
 (for Chronology of Bishops)  

17th-century Roman Catholic titular bishops
Bishops appointed by Pope Urban VIII
1596 births
1650 deaths